Maua albigutta is a cicada species that is widely distributed in Sumatra and Peninsular Malaysia and has been recorded once from Borneo

References

External links
Frequency modulated song of the cicada Maua albigutta
Movie of singing Maua albigutta

Fauna of Southeast Asia
Taxa named by Francis Walker (entomologist)
Insects described in 1856
Leptopsaltriini